Marián Ďatko (born 18 June 1977) is a Slovak football player, currently plays for ŠKF Sereď.

External links
FK Slovan Duslo Šaľa Profile

References

1977 births
Living people
Association football defenders
Slovak footballers
FC Nitra players
FK Slovan Duslo Šaľa players
Slovak Super Liga players